Pterynotus laurae is a species of sea snail, a marine gastropod mollusk in the family Muricidae, the murex snails or rock snails.

Description
The length of the shell attains 46.4 mm.

Distribution
This marine species occurs off the Philippines.

References

 Houart, R., 1997. Description of Pterynotus laurae n. sp. from the Philippine Islands (Gastropoda, Muricidae, Muricinae). Apex 12(4): 121-124

laurae
Gastropods described in 1997